"Love's Great Adventure" is a single released by Ultravox on 12 October 1984. Having enjoyed massive radio airplay that autumn, the single became Ultravox's thirteenth Top 30 single in Britain, and was their last major hit in the UK, peaking at #12 in the UK Singles Chart. The style of this single is different from any of their preceding Lament singles, aiming for a more lightweight, pop-oriented approach.

Background 

The music video was filmed in Kenya and features the band members in a humorous parody of Indiana Jones, with Midge Ure being chased across deserts and forests by a ruthless treasure hunter. Midge Ure stated in his autobiography, If I Was, that the aim of the single and its video was to promote Ultravox as having a sense of humour, away from the seriousness of their previous releases. Also in the video is Ure's future wife Annabel Giles. The music in the video stops halfway through where a seemingly exhausted Midge Ure, tired from minutes of endless running around has to sit down for a moment and take a breather. He rests for a moment then takes a breath before standing up recovered and continuing with the song at which point the music starts up once again.

The song, based on a riff for a Levi's jeans commercial which was not taken up by the company, was not released on a studio album, instead appearing on their 1984 compilation album The Collection.

Billy Currie said 1984: "We wanted to do something different, to get out of the way singles that are taken from an album tend to sound the same as each other. You know, when any band puts out several singles from the same album, they might appear to be very different in some ways, but because they were all recorded at the same time, they have the same feel to them. We wanted to get away from that - do a one-off single totally separate from any album. The recording was a lot more immediate than 'Lament'. We decided not to go into the studio and spend a long time doing it, because things can become really sluggish when you're doing albums. For the single there was plenty of momentum going, and the momentum thing is important: having done the single like that, I'd now like to do an album in the same way - do it with just a couple of days' rehearsals, or none at all, which was what we did for the single."

Warren Cann said 1984: "It's in threes, and it's got a very up, happy melody, which is why we decided to persevere with it in the first place. We'd tried things in that time signature before, but they'd always sounded contrived, but this one doesn't. There's no real technical trickery in making it, it's the strength of the song that carries it through."

In popular culture 

An episode of the BBC series Inside No. 9, also called "Love's Great Adventure", used this song as its closing theme.

Track listing

7" version 
 "Love's Great Adventure" – 3:04 - (Cross, Ure)
 "White China (Live June 84 at Hammersmith Odeon)" – 3:43 - (music: Cross, Cann, Currie - lyrics: Ure)

12" version 
 "Love's Great Adventure (Extended Version)" – 5:40
 "White China (Live June 84 at Hammersmith Odeon)" – 3:43
 "Man of Two Worlds (Instrumental)" – 4:32 - (music: Currie, Cann, Cross, Ure - lyrics: Ure)

References

Ultravox songs
1984 singles
Songs written by Midge Ure
Songs written by Chris Cross
Songs written by Billy Currie
Songs written by Warren Cann
1984 songs
Chrysalis Records singles